Scythia Minor was the name of a number of various regions in late Classical Antiquity.

 Scythia Minor, two Scythian kingdoms in ancient Crimea and on the lower Danube
 Scythia Minor (Roman province), a province of the later Roman and early Byzantine empire